The Dom (also called Domi;  / ALA-LC: ,  / , Ḍom /  or , or sometimes also called Doms) are descendants of the Dom with origins in the Indian subcontinent which through ancient migrations are found scattered across Middle East, North Africa, the Eastern Anatolia Region, and parts of the Balkans and Hungary. The traditional language of the Dom is Domari, an endangered Indo-Aryan language, thereby making the Dom an Indo-Aryan ethnic group.

They used to be grouped with other traditionally itinerant ethnic groups originating from India: the Rom and Lom people. However, they left India at different times and used different routes. The Domari language has a separate origin in India from Romani and Doms are not closer to the Romani people than other Indians such as Gujaratis. Dom people do not identify themselves as Romanis.

Culture 
The Dom has an oral tradition and expresses their culture and history through music, poetry, and dance. Initially, it was believed that they were a branch of the Romani people, but recent studies of the Domari language suggest that they departed from the Indian subcontinent at different times and using different routes.

The word Dom are used to describe peoples from Middle East, North Africa and Eastern Anatolia Region/Turkey.

In Morocco, Sidi Mimoun and Ben Souda groups are among the most known Moroccan Dom groups; they are known for their singing and music.

Among the various Domari subgroups, they were initially part of Ghawazi who were known for their dancing and music business. The Ghawazi dancers as have been associated with the development of their dancing reputation under the rule of Muhammad Ali Pasha. Some Muslim Roma must have Dom ancestry too, because in Evliya Çelebi's Seyahatname of 1668, he explained that the Gypsy's from Komotini (Gümülcine) swear by their heads, their ancestors came from Egypt. Also the sedentary Gypsys groups from Serres region in Greece, believe their ancestors were once taken from Egypt Eyalet by the Ottomans after 1517 to Rumelia, to work on the tobacco plantations of Turkish feudals there. Muslim Roma settled in Baranya and the City Pécs at the Ottoman Hungary. After the Siege of Pécs when Habsburg took it back, Muslim Roma and some other Muslims converted to the Catholic faith in the years 1686 -1713. The Ghagar a subgroup of the Doms in Egypt, tell that some of them went to Hungary.

Distribution 
The majority of the estimated population of 2.2 million live in Iran, Eastern Anatolia Region in Turkey, and with significant numbers in Syria and Iraq. Smaller populations are found in Afghanistan, Libya, Tunisia, Algeria, Morocco, Mauritania, Sudan, Jordan, Egypt, Israel, Palestine, Lebanon and other countries of the Middle East and North Africa.

There is a large concentration of Dom in Jordan. Researchers have written that "they accommodate Arab racism by hiding their ethnic identity", since they would not be accepted into Arabian society once their true identity is revealed. In Jordan, they call themselves Bani Murra.

See also
Nawar (Syria)
Zott

References 

Tarlan, K. V (2018). "Encouraging Integration and Social Cohesion of Syrian Dom Immigrants Proposal for a Regional Social Inclusion Strategy Turkey, Lebanon and Jordan". Gaziantep: Kırkayak Kültür.
Tarlan, K. V., Faggo, H (2018). "The 'Other' Asylum Seekers from Syria: Discrimination, Isolation, and Social Exclusion. Syrian Dom Asylum Seekers in the Crossfire". Gaziantep: Kırkayak Kültür - Kemal Vural Tarlan, Hacer Foggo.

External links 

 Dom Research Center 
 "The Gypsies of Jerusalem: the Forgotten People" By Amoun Sleem
 Domari The society of Gypsies in Jerusalem
 "The Gypsy People of Israel, Gaza & the West Bank" by Valery Novoselsky
 "Evolving, educating: Israel's Gypsy community" by Roi Mandel
 "The Dom People and their Children in Lebanon" by Terre des Hommes
 "From The Occupation of Iraq to 'The Arab Spring': Gypsies in the Middle East" by Kemal Vural Tarlan
 Middle East Gypsies

 
Indo-Aryan peoples